Mathagadi is a rural municipality in Palpa District in Lumbini Province of southern Nepal. At the time of the 1991 Nepal census it had a population of 2109 people living in 325 individual households.

References

Populated places in Palpa District